James Luck (born 30 September 1992), better known by the stage name Elektra Shock, is a New Zealand drag performer best known for competing on the first season of RuPaul's Drag Race Down Under and the second season of House of Drag.

 Early life 
Luck was born in England and raised in Invercargill, New Zealand where he attended Southland Boys' High School. He studied dance at the Urban Dance Centre in Sydney, Australia.

 Career 
Luck has worked as a backup dancer for acts such as Sia, Jesse James, and Little Mix. He was a backup dancer in the 2012 Summer Olympics Closing Ceremony for Annie Lennox.

In 2018, Luck was a guest dancer on Dancing with the Stars and was on the judging panel of Indian-inspired dance competition The Great NZ Dance Masala.

Elektra  was a contestant on the second season of the New Zealand drag competition show House of Drag, placing as the runner-up. On the show, she won four challenges, the most in the show's history, and never placed in the bottom. She was eliminated in the final lip sync by that season's winner, New Zealand drag queen Spankie Jackzon.

In March 2021, Elektra was announced as a competitor on the first season of RuPaul's Drag Race Down Under. House of Drag'' hosts and judges Kita Mean and Anita Wigl'it competed alongside Elektra, making Elektra the first Drag Race contestant to compete against the judges of a previous show she was on.

Elektra became known as a "lip sync assassin" on her season, eliminating JoJo Zaho and Coco Jumbo in episodes 1 and 3. She won the commercial challenge in episode 5. 
In episode 7, she landed in the bottom two and was eliminated by season winner Kita Mean.

The name "Elektra Shock" is derived from electric shock; the name was given to her by her drag mother Trinity Ice.

Luck appeared as a judge on the ninth series of Dancing with the Stars.

Personal life
Luck has identified as queer. He lives in the Ponsonby neighborhood of Auckland with his partner Michael.

Filmography

Television

References

1992 births
Living people
New Zealand drag queens
New Zealand dancers
People educated at Southland Boys' High School
People from Invercargill
Queer people
RuPaul's Drag Race Down Under contestants